Astroblepus is a genus of fish in the family Astroblepidae found in South America and Panama. This genus is the only member of its family. These catfishes are primarily found in torrential streams in the Andean area. Astroblepus pholeter and A. riberae are troglobites adapted to living in subterranean water systems. The largest species reaches . These fish have suckermouths like those of loricariids. They have two pairs of barbels, maxillary and nasal. The dorsal fin spine lacks a locking mechanism. These fish also have odontodes, tiny teeth on their skin. All species exhibit a conical, pointy type on their fin rays like that found in other loricarioids; other species also exhibit a blunt type that is only found on their skin.

Some of these fish are able to live in high altitude and climb the faces of waterfalls. Their climbing ability comes from specially developed pelvic fins, as well as their suckermouths. In their Neotropical Andean habitat, dry and wet seasons are quite extreme, and odontodes may help in sensing food, mates and water flow, as well as help cling to surfaces. They feed upon invertebrates, such as caterpillars and annelids.

The Astroblepidae were usually placed within Siluriformes as the sister family of Loricariidae, but a recent study found them to be more closely related to the family Scoloplacidae.

Species
There are currently 80 recognized species in this genus:
 Astroblepus acostai Ardila Rodríguez, 2011 
 Astroblepus ardiladuartei Ardila Rodríguez, 2015 
 Astroblepus ardilai Ardila Rodríguez, 2012 
 Astroblepus bellezaensis Ardila Rodríguez, 2015 
 Astroblepus boulengeri (Regan, 1904)
 Astroblepus brachycephalus (Günther, 1859)
 Astroblepus cacharas Ardila Rodríguez, 2011 
 Astroblepus cajamarcaensis Ardila Rodríguez, 2013 <ref name=Ardila2013>Ardila Rodríguez, C.A. (2013): Astroblepus hidalgoi – A. floridaensis – A. huallagaensis y A. cajamarcaensis: Cuatro nuevas especies de los Andes del Peru. Universidad Metropolitana de Barranquilla. Barranquilla, Colombia. 22pp.</ref>
 Astroblepus caquetae Fowler, 1943
 Astroblepus chapmani (C. H. Eigenmann, 1912)
 Astroblepus chimborazoi (Fowler, 1915)
 Astroblepus chinchaoensis Ardila Rodríguez, 2014 
 Astroblepus chotae (Regan, 1904)
 Astroblepus cirratus (Regan, 1912)
 Astroblepus curitiensis Ardila Rodríguez, 2015 
 Astroblepus cyclopus (Humboldt, 1805)
 Astroblepus eigenmanni (Regan, 1904)
 Astroblepus festae (Boulenger, 1898)
 Astroblepus fissidens (Regan, 1904)
 Astroblepus floridablancaensis Ardila Rodríguez, 2016 
 Astroblepus floridaensis Ardila Rodríguez, 2013 
 Astroblepus formosus Fowler, 1945
 Astroblepus frenatus C. H. Eigenmann, 1918
 Astroblepus grixalvii Humboldt, 1805
 Astroblepus guentheri (Boulenger, 1887)
 Astroblepus heterodon (Regan, 1908)
 Astroblepus hidalgoi Ardila Rodríguez, 2013 
 Astroblepus homodon (Regan, 1904)
 Astroblepus huallagaensis Ardila Rodríguez, 2013 
 Astroblepus itae Ardila Rodríguez, 2011 
 Astroblepus jimenezae Ardila Rodríguez, 2013 
 Astroblepus jurubidae Fowler, 1944
 Astroblepus labialis N. E. Pearson, 1937
 Astroblepus latidens C. H. Eigenmann, 1918
 Astroblepus longiceps N. E. Pearson, 1924
 Astroblepus longifilis (Steindachner, 1882)
 Astroblepus mancoi C. H. Eigenmann, 1928
 Astroblepus mariae (Fowler, 1919)
 Astroblepus marmoratus (Regan, 1904)
 Astroblepus martinezi Ardila Rodríguez, 2013 
 Astroblepus mendezi Ardila Rodríguez, 2014 
 Astroblepus micrescens C. H. Eigenmann, 1918
 Astroblepus mindoensis (Regan, 1916)
 Astroblepus mojicai Ardila Rodríguez, 2015 
 Astroblepus moyanensis Ardila Rodríguez, 2014 
 Astroblepus nettoferreirai Ardila Rodríguez, 2015 
 Astroblepus nicefori G. S. Myers, 1932
 Astroblepus onzagaensis Ardila Rodríguez, 2015 
 Astroblepus orientalis (Boulenger, 1903)
 Astroblepus ortegai Ardila Rodríguez, 2012 
 Astroblepus peruanus (Steindachner, 1876)
 Astroblepus phelpsi L. P. Schultz, 1944
 Astroblepus pholeter Collette, 1962
 Astroblepus pirrensis (Meek & Hildebrand, 1913)
 Astroblepus pradai Ardila Rodríguez, 2015 
 Astroblepus praeliorum W. R. Allen, 1942
 Astroblepus prenadillus (Valenciennes, 1840)
 Astroblepus putumayoensis Ardila Rodríguez, 2015 
 Astroblepus quispei Ardila Rodríguez, 2012 
 Astroblepus regani (Pellegrin, 1909)
 Astroblepus rengifoi Dahl, 1960
 Astroblepus retropinnus (Regan, 1908)
 Astroblepus riberae Cardona & Guerao, 1994
 Astroblepus rosei C. H. Eigenmann, 1922
 Astroblepus sabalo (Valenciennes, 1840)
 Astroblepus santanderensis C. H. Eigenmann, 1918
 Astroblepus simonsii (Regan, 1904)
 Astroblepus stuebeli (Wandolleck, 1916)
 Astroblepus supramollis N. E. Pearson, 1937
 Astroblepus taczanowskii (Boulenger, 1890)
 Astroblepus tamboensis Ardila Rodríguez, 2014 
 Astroblepus theresiae (Steindachner, 1907)
 Astroblepus trifasciatus (C. H. Eigenmann, 1912)
 Astroblepus ubidiai (Pellegrin, 1931)
 Astroblepus unifasciatus (C. H. Eigenmann, 1912)
 Astroblepus vaillanti (Regan, 1904)
 Astroblepus vanceae (C. H. Eigenmann, 1913)
 Astroblepus ventralis (C. H. Eigenmann, 1912)
 Astroblepus verai Ardila Rodríguez, 2015 
 Astroblepus whymperi'' (Boulenger, 1890)

References

 
Astroblepidae
Catfish genera
Fish of the Andes
Fish of South America
Freshwater fish genera
Taxa named by Alexander von Humboldt